Ernstia tetractina is a species of calcareous sponge found off the coast of Arraial do Cabo, Brazil.

References

Ernstia
Animals described in 2001
Fauna of Brazil